Holger Hocke (born 8 March 1945) is a German rowing coxswain. He competed in the men's coxed pair event at the 1976 Summer Olympics.

References

External links
 

1945 births
Living people
German male rowers
Olympic rowers of West Germany
Rowers at the 1976 Summer Olympics
Rowers from Hamburg
World Rowing Championships medalists for Germany